This was the first edition of the event.

Björn Borg won the tournament, beating Brian Teacher in the final, 6–3, 6–4.

Seeds

  Jimmy Connors (second round)
  Björn Borg (champion)
  Vitas Gerulaitis (quarterfinals)
  Eddie Dibbs (quarterfinals)
  Harold Solomon (quarterfinals)
  Sandy Mayer (semifinals)
  Ilie Năstase (semifinals)
  Arthur Ashe (quarterfinals)

Draw

Finals

Top half

Bottom half

External links
 Main draw

1978 Grand Prix (tennis)
Tokyo Indoor